Ajax Plaza Bus Terminal was a bus station in Ajax, Ontario, Canada. It was located along the east side of the shopping centre parking lot at 190 Harwood Avenue South, south of Highway 401. The facility was used by Durham Region Transit, GO Transit and Greyhound.

The station closed on January 2, 2014. The building has since been demolished and left the area vacant. Two DRT bus stops are located nearby.

References

External links

GO Transit bus terminals
Transport in Ajax, Ontario
Former bus stations
2014 disestablishments in Ontario
Buildings and structures demolished in 2014
Transport buildings and structures in the Regional Municipality of Durham
History of transport in the Regional Municipality of Durham